Daniele Suzuki (born 21 September 1977) is a Brazilian actress, filmmaker, and television host.

Biography 
Born in Rio de Janeiro, Danielle Suzuki is the daughter of Hiroshi Suzuki, a second generation Japanese Brazilian from São Paulo, whose parents immigrated from Shizuoka. Her mother is Ivone Suzuki, a Brazilian from Minas Gerais, of German, Italian and Native Brazilian descent. Her father walked out on her family when she was 15 and moved back to São Paulo. Suzuki was raised in Rio de Janeiro by her mother and grandmother and faced financial difficulties; she had to live at her mother's friend home because her father sold the family house, leaving them with no options. Suzuki said about this period that she "didn't go angry because she always had supporting friends". Since then, she reportedly rarely sees her father.

Career
When she was 15, Suzuki started her career as a model, despite finding that her Asian appearance somewhat limited her chances. She graduated in Industrial Design in Pontifical Catholic University of Rio de Janeiro. Later, she started acting, gaining fame as the Brazilian teenager Miyuki in the telenovela Malhação. Nowadays, Suzuki also works as a host in Pé no Chão show, on the Brazilian Multishow channel.

Filmography
 2019 – Desjuntados - Patrícia 
 2017 – Um casal inseparável - Cristina
 2016 – Baile de máscaras - Fernanda
 2015 – Malhação Sonhos - Roberta
 2012 – Cheias de Charme – Herself
 2009 – Viver a Vida – Ellen
 2008 – Ciranda de Pedra – Alice / Amélia
 2006 – Pé na Jaca – Rosa Tanaka
 2005 – Bang Bang – Yoko Bell
 2004 – Malhação – Miyuki Shimahara
 2003 – Malhação – Miyuki Shimahara
 2003 – Sandy & Junior – Yoko
 2000 – Uga-Uga – Sarah
Special
 2010 – Diversão & Cia – Keila
 2007 – Conexão Xuxa – Herself
 2006 – Os Caras de Pau – Herself
 2006 – Dança no Gelo – (reality show – Domingão do Faustão) (second place)

Host
 The Voice Brasil
 Pé no Chão
 Tribos
 Mandou Bem
 Demorô
 Destino Verão

Cinema
2008 – O Guerreiro Didi e a Ninja Lili.... Yolanda
2000 – Sabor da Paixão

References

External links

 
 

1977 births
Living people
Actresses from Rio de Janeiro (city)
Brazilian people of Japanese descent
Brazilian people of Italian descent
Brazilian people of indigenous peoples descent
Brazilian people of German descent
Brazilian television actresses
Brazilian telenovela actresses
Actresses of Japanese descent
Pontifical Catholic University of Rio de Janeiro alumni
Brazilian emigrants to the United States